A pond is a small body of standing water.

Pond may also refer to:

Places
 Pond, California, a community in Kern County, California
 Pond River, a 90.8-mile-long (146.1 km) tributary of the Green River, located in the western part of Kentucky
 Pond Creek (disambiguation)
 Ponds Creek, a creek in New South Wales, Australia
 The Pond, an informal term used primarily for the Atlantic Ocean
 Honda Center, an indoor arena in Anaheim, California, nicknamed "The Pond" when it was formerly known as Arrowhead Pond
 Pond, Missouri A former unincorporated community in St. Louis County

Other uses
 Pond (surname), a surname
 Pond (American band), rock band from Portland, Oregon
 Pond (Australian band), psychedelic band from Perth
 Pond (book), 2015 collection of short stories
 Pond (currency), used in the Orange Free State, the South African Republic, and New Griqualand
 Pond's, health and beauty care brand
 Waste stabilization pond, a wastewater treatment system
 Ice rink, slang term
 An obsolete metric unit of force; see kilopond
 "Pond", a song by Spratleys Japs from Pony

See also
 Nowy Staw (New Pond), a village in Malbork County, Pomeranian Voivodeship, Poland
 The Pond (disambiguation)
 The Ponds (disambiguation)